Holwell is a surname. Notable people with the surname include:

John Holwell (1649–1686?) English astrologer and mathematician
John Zephaniah Holwell (1711–1798), employee of the English East India Company and writer on the East Indies
Richard J. Holwell (born 1946), District Judge, United States District Court for the Southern District of New York
William Holwell (1726–1798), English cleric